Hilarographa is a genus of moths belonging to the family Tortricidae.

Species
Hilarographa ancilla Razowski, 2009
Hilarographa aurosa  Diakonoff & Arita, 1976
Hilarographa auroscripta Razowski, 2009
Hilarographa baliana Razowski, 2009
Hilarographa batychtra (Razowski & Pelz, 2005)
Hilarographa bellica  Meyrick, 1912
Hilarographa belizastrum Razowski & Wojtusiak, 2011
Hilarographa belizeae Razowski, 2009
Hilarographa bosavina Razowski, 2009
Hilarographa bryonota  Meyrick, 1921
Hilarographa buruana Razowski, 2009
Hilarographa calathisca  Meyrick, 1909
Hilarographa calyx Razowski, 2009
Hilarographa caminodes  Meyrick, 1905
Hilarographa castanea Razowski & Wojtusiak, 2009
Hilarographa celebesiana Razowski, 2009
Hilarographa ceramopa  Meyrick, 1920
Hilarographa charagmotorna Razowski, 2009
Hilarographa citharistis  Meyrick, 1909
Hilarographa cladara  (Diakonoff, 1977),
Hilarographa crocochorista  (Diakonoff, 1983),
Hilarographa cubensis (Heppner, 1983)
Hilarographa cymatodes  (Diakonoff, 1983)
Hilarographa decoris  Diakonoff & Arita, 1976
Hilarographa dolichosticha  (Diakonoff, 1977)
Hilarographa druidica  (Meyrick, 1909)
Hilarographa dulcisana  Walker, 1863
Hilarographa eremnotorna  Diakonoff & Arita, 1976
Hilarographa eriglypta  Meyrick, 1921
Hilarographa euphronica  Meyrick, 1920
Hilarographa excellens  (Pagenstecher, 1900)
Hilarographa fergussonana Razowski, 2009
Hilarographa ferox  Meyrick, 1921
Hilarographa gentinga Razowski, 2009
Hilarographa grapholithana (Razowski & Pelz, 2005)
Hilarographa gunongana Razowski, 2009
Hilarographa hainanica Razowski, 2009
Hilarographa hermatodes  Meyrick, 1909
Hilarographa hexapeda  Meyrick, 1913
Hilarographa iquitosana Razowski, 2009
Hilarographa johnibradleyi Razowski, 2009
Hilarographa jonesi Brower, 1953
Hilarographa khaoyai Razowski, 2009
Hilarographa leucopyrga  Meyrick, 1912
Hilarographa ludens  Diakonoff, 1948
Hilarographa macaria  (Diakonoff, 1977)
Hilarographa machaerophora  Diakonoff & Arita, 1976
Hilarographa marangana Razowski, 2009
Hilarographa mariannae Razowski, 2009
Hilarographa mechanica  Meyrick, 1909
Hilarographa meekana Razowski, 2009
Hilarographa merinthias  Meyrick, 1909
Hilarographa mesostigmatias  (Diakonoff, 1977)
Hilarographa methystis  Meyrick, 1921
Hilarographa muluana Razowski, 2009
Hilarographa obinana Razowski, 2009
Hilarographa odontia Razowski & Wojtusiak, 2011
Hilarographa oenobapta  (Diakonoff, 1977),
Hilarographa opistocapna  (Diakonoff, 1977)
Hilarographa orthochrysa  Meyrick, 1932
Hilarographa pahangana Razowski, 2009
Hilarographa parambae Razowski, 2009
Hilarographa perakana Razowski, 2009
Hilarographa phlox  (Diakonoff, 1977),
Hilarographa plectanodes  Meyrick, 1921
Hilarographa plurimana  Walker, 1863
Hilarographa quinquestrigana  Walker, 1866
Hilarographa rampayoha Razowski, 2009
Hilarographa refluxana  Walker, 1863 
Hilarographa regalis (Walsingham, 1881)
Hilarographa renonga Razowski, 2009
Hilarographa ribbei  Zeller, 1877
Hilarographa robinsoni Razowski, 2009
Hilarographa sepidmarginata Razowski & Wojtusiak, 2011
Hilarographa shehkonga Razowski, 2009
Hilarographa sipiroca Razowski, 2009
Hilarographa soleana Razowski, 2009
Hilarographa spermatodesma  Diakonoff, 1955
Hilarographa swederiana  Stoll, in Cramer, 1791 
Hilarographa tasekia Razowski, 2009
Hilarographa temburonga Razowski, 2009
Hilarographa tetralina  Meyrick, 1930
Hilarographa thaliarcha  Meyrick, 1920 
Hilarographa tornoxena  (Diakonoff, 1977)
Hilarographa uluana Razowski, 2009
Hilarographa undosa  (Diakonoff, 1977)
Hilarographa uthaithani Razowski, 2009
Hilarographa vinsonella Guillermet, 2013
Hilarographa xanthotoxa  Meyrick, 1920
Hilarographa youngiella (Busck, 1922)
Hilarographa zapyra  Meyrick, 1886

Placement unknown
Hilarographa cirrhocosma Meyrick, 1930
Hilarographa pampoecila (Turner, 1913)

References

 , 2005, World Catalogue of Insects volume 5 Tortricidae
 , 2009: Descriptions and notes on neotropical Hilarographa Zeller (Lepidoptera: Tortricidae). Polish Journal of Entomology 78 (3): 209-221. Full article: 
 , 2009: Tortricidae (Lepidoptera) from the mountains of Ecuador and remarks on their geographical distribution. Part IV. Eastern Cordillera. Acta Zoologica Cracoviensia 51B (1-2): 119-187. doi:10.3409/azc.52b_1-2.119-187. Full article: .
 , 2011: Tortricidae (Lepidoptera) from Colombia). Acta Zoologica Cracoviensia 54B (1-2): 103-128. Full article:  .
 , 1877, Horae Soc. ent. Ross. 13: 187.

External links
tortricidae.com

Hilarographini
Tortricidae genera
Taxa named by Philipp Christoph Zeller